Giant Drag is an American indie rock band formed in Los Angeles, California, in 2003 by singer and guitarist Annie Hardy and drummer and keyboardist Micah Calabrese. After releasing their debut EP, Lemona in 2004, the band released their debut studio album, Hearts and Unicorns (2005) through Kickball Records, a subsidiary of Interscope.

Interscope dropped the band from their label after issuing their single, "This Isn't It", in 2006, and Calabrese subsequently left the project. Hardy continued to record material for the band, and their second album, Waking Up is Hard to Do, was self-released in 2013 through their own label, Full Psycho Records.

In 2020, Hardy revealed she had written and recorded a third album with former Klaxons singer Jamie Reynolds in London.

History

2003–2013
Giant Drag was formed in Los Angeles in May 2003 by singer and guitarist Annie Hardy and drummer Micah Calabrese. The two became acquainted initially in 2001, as Calabrese was a co-worker of Hardy's mother at the internet company she was employed at, though they later formally met in 2003 after two of their mutual friends began dating. The two considered hiring a bassist to join the group, but instead, Calabrese began performing bass using a synthesizer with one hand, while drumming with the other. Performing both roles limited Calabrese's drumming performance, but soon became a stylistic element of the duo's music.

The band released their first EP, Lemona in 2004. Their debut album, Hearts and Unicorns, came out the following year through Kickball Records, a subsidiary of Interscope. The group toured in England in the fall of 2005, opening for Nine Black Alps to support the album. In 2006, they released their single "This Isn't It" before Interscope dropped them from the label. Between 2006 and 2008, the band toured internationally as an opening act for The Jesus and Mary Chain, Scissor Sisters, Pretty Girls Make Graves, Nine Black Alps, The Lemonheads and The Cribs, and were named by the NME as one of the "big things in 2006". They also performed in the Coachella Valley Music and Arts Festival in 2006. During this time, Hardy performed as a guest vocalist on the track "Pink Cellphone" from the 2006 Deftones album entitled Saturday Night Wrist. In the summer of 2007, the band's cover of Chris Isaak's "Wicked Game" was used in the promos for season 5 of the FX Networks series Nip/Tuck. During this period, Calabrese left and rejoined the band several times. In November 2007, a cover of Madonna's "Oh Father" was released by the band on the tribute album Through the Wilderness.

In December 2008, NME announced that Hardy was suffering from muscle disorder fibromyalgia. According to College News, her condition was later referenced in Paul Avion's song "Fibromyalgia". In January 2010, fellow L.A. musician Paul Avion chose "Kevin is Gay" to kick off a series of articles about Africa for SPIN Earth. The Swan Song EP was released on February 16, 2010. After meeting at a show in Silverlake, Stretch joined the band as a drummer to tour and demo new material following Calabrese's departure. In December 2010, Hardy's Twitter account mentioned a new full-length album had  been completed, with no firm date set for release yet.

On February 9, 2012, Giant Drag released the alternative version of the band's song "Drugs" via Hardy's Bandcamp page, and another song called "Firestorm". On February 14, 2012, the band announced a new format of digital releases called "Twosies". This format is between singles and EPs. The first twosie was released on the same day of the announcement and is titled Annie Hardy and The Wallpaper Demos. The titles of the new tracks are "Out At Sea" and "Say What You Will". 
 On March 6, 2012, a new twosie was released, "Hearts and Unicorns Outtakes and Unreleased Rarity". On February 13, 2013, they were named as one of the "unfairly forgotten bands of the 2000s" by NME.

On March 5, 2013, the band's long-awaited second album, Waking Up is Hard to Do was released as a digital download on Giant Drag's Bandcamp music store. It marked the band's first full-length release of original material since Hearts and Unicorns (2005).

2014–present
In March 2014, the band released the EP Band Car, also via Bandcamp.

In 2020, while Hardy was quarantined for COVID-19 restrictions in London prior to shooting the horror film Dashcam, in which starred, she recorded Giant Drag's third studio album at The Libertines' recording studio, The Albion Rooms, alongside another secret project. The material was recorded with Jamie Reynolds, formerly of the English rock group Klaxons. Commenting on the recording, Hardy stated: "I think I was an idiot savant before, or just an idiot – I’m not sure. I could write songs but I wasn’t really invested. I was always really sedated, taking a lot of pills and whatnot. Now I’m very present and I know what I’m doing for the first time."

In 2021, the band independently issued the EPs Lemona and Swan Song as a joint release on vinyl for the first time. In June 2022, the band, featuring Hardy and drummer Collin Deatherage, released the track "Devil Inside", which had previously been recorded for their EP Band Car; the track was featured as a promotional single for the horror film Dashcam (2021), in which Hardy starred.

Style
Giant Drag's sound has been described by several music publications as "nü-grunge". The band has also been compared to bands such as My Bloody Valentine, The Breeders, PJ Harvey, and Mazzy Star although the band does not completely agree with some of the comparisons and Hardy has shown herself to be especially confused by Breeders comparisons. It has been suggested by Hardy and another journalist that most articles that have been written about Giant Drag are re-wordings of their press pack (which compared them to such bands). Some music critics, such as Bobby Hankinson of The Boston Globe, likened Hardy's vocals and guitar playing to that of Liz Phair and Courtney Love.

Hardy has named various rock acts as influences, including Babes in Toyland, Hole, The Beatles, The Misfits, the Descendents, and Danzig.

Hardy's lyrics have attracted attention or their blunt and sometimes humorous nature. Hardy commented that this lyrical approach has been her "long-term defensee mechanism. When dealing with something painful and honest and vulnerable you’ve got to come back and attack that subject with equal amounts of humour and then that kind of then softens the blow." Their song titles are sometimes similarly humorous, such as "Kevin Is Gay," "My Dick Sux," "High Friends in Places," and "YFLMD"—an acronym for "You Fuck Like My Dad". Live performances were often notable for Hardy's monologues in-between songs while Calabrese set up his synthesizer. During performances in 2006 the duo covered Chris Isaak's "Wicked Game." Hardy jokingly introduced the song by telling a variation on the basic story that she wrote the song for Chris Isaak when she was 8, and that he stole it from her after a love affair, and that she saw him years later on MTV singing "her" song "rolling around in the sand with some hooker."

Personnel
 Annie Hardy – vocals, guitar
 Collin Deatherage – drums, bass
 Micah Calabrese – drums, keyboards, synthesizer (2003–2011)
 Eli Smith – drums, keyboards (2004-2005)
 Bobby Vega – drums
 Alvin DeGuzman – bass

Discography

Studio albums
 Hearts and Unicorns (2005) 
 Waking Up is Hard to Do (2013)

Singles
 "Kevin is Gay" (2005)
 "This Isn't It" (2006)
 "Wicked Game" (2006)

Extended plays
 Lemona (2004) 
 Swan Song (2010) 
 Band Car (2014)

Live albums
 Shredding Leeds Live in England (2013)

Videography
"This Isn't It" (directed by G.J. Echternkamp)
"Kevin Is Gay" (directed by G.J. Echternkamp)
"Stuff to Live For" (directed by G.J. Echternkamp)
"Do It" (directed by Lance Arnao lavisuals.com)
"90210" (directed by Annie Hardy)
"Garbage Heart" (directed by Annie Hardy and Amos Memon)
"Sobriety Is A Sobering Experience" (directed by Annie Hardy and Jana Jordan)
"We Like the Weather" (directed by Colin Maccubbin)
"Won't Come Around" (directed by Annie Hardy and Colin Maccubbin)

References

External links

 (Archived)
 at Discogs

Indie rock musical groups from California
Musical groups from Los Angeles
Rock music duos
Grunge musical groups
Musical groups established in 2003
Wichita Recordings artists
2003 establishments in California